This article lists the main weightlifting events and their results for 2019.

World weightlifting championships and cups
 February 22 – 27: 2019 IWF World Cup #1 in  Fuzhou
  won both the gold and overall medal tallies.
 March 8 – 15: 2019 Youth World Weightlifting Championships in  Las Vegas
  won the gold medal tally.  and  won 6 overall medals each.
 June 1 – 8: 2019 Junior World Weightlifting Championships in  Suva
  won the gold medal tally.  won the overall medal tally.
 Team winners:  (m) / The  (f)
 September 18 – 27: 2019 World Weightlifting Championships in  Pattaya
  won both the gold and overall medal tallies.
 December 13 – 17: 2019 IWF World Cup #2 in  Tianjin

Continental and regional weightlifting championships
 April 6 – 13: 2019 European Weightlifting Championships in  Batumi
  and  won 3 gold medals each. Russia won the overall medal tally.
 April 18 – 28: 2019 Asian Weightlifting Championships in  Ningbo
  won both the gold and overall medal tallies.
 April 21 – 28: 2019 Pan American Weightlifting Championships in  Guatemala City
 The  won both the gold and overall medal tallies.
 April 23 – 30: 2019 African Weightlifting Championships in  Cairo
  won both the gold and overall medal tallies.
 May 8 – 12: 2019 South American, Ibero-American, & OPEN Senior Championships in  Palmira
 South American:  won both the gold and overall medal tallies.
 Ibero-American:  won both the gold and overall medal tallies.
 OPEN Senior:  won both the gold and overall medal tallies.
 June 23 – 30: 2019 Pan American Junior Weightlifting Championships in  Havana
  won both the gold and overall medal tallies.
 July 9 – 14: 2019 Oceania & Commonwealth Weightlifting Championships, and Part of the 2019 Pacific Games in  Apia
 2019 Oceania Senior & Pacific Games:  and  won 4 gold medals each. Samoa won the overall medal tally.
 2019 Oceania Junior:  won the gold medal tally. Samoa and  won 11 overall medals each.
 2019 Oceania Youth:  won both the gold and overall medal tallies.
 2019 Commonwealth Senior:  won both the gold and overall medal tallies.
 2019 Commonwealth Junior:  and  won 6 gold medals each. India won the overall medal tally.
 2019 Commonwealth Youth:  and  won 6 gold medals each. Nauru and  won 12 overall medals each.
 August 24 – 29: 2019 Pan American Youth Weightlifting Championships in  Guayaquil
 September 6 – 12: 2019 African Junior & Youth Weightlifting Championships in  Kampala
 Junior:  won both the gold and overall medal tallies.
 Youth:  won both the gold and overall medal tallies.
 October 12 & 13: 2019 Nordic Weightlifting Championships in  Vigrestad
 October 19 – 27: 2019 European Junior & U23 Weightlifting Championships in  Bucharest
 October 19 – 27: 2019 Asian Junior & Youth Weightlifting Championships in  Pyongyang
 November 20 – 29: 2019 Arabic Weightlifting Championships in  Tunis
 December 1 – 8: 2019 South American, Ibero-American, & CSLP Junior & Youth Weightlifting CHampionships in  Buenos Aires
 December 4 – 12: 2019 European Youth Weightlifting Championships in  Eilat

Other weightlifting events
 January 25 – 27: Nauru Independence Day International Tournament in 
  won both the gold and overall medal tallies.
 June 7 – 9: British International Open 2019 in  Coventry
  won the gold medal tally.  won the overall medals tally.
 July 6 & 7: Japan-China-Korea Friendship Tournament in  Tokyo
  won both the gold and overall medal tallies.
 July 6 & 7: Ready Steady Tokyo (Tokyo 2020 Test Event) in 
  won both the gold and overall medal tallies.
 November 8 – 10: 2019 IWF Grand Prix in  Lima
  won both the gold and overall medal tallies.

References

External links
 International Weightlifting Federation Website

 
Weightlifting by year
2019 sport-related lists